Sir Herbert Ronald Robinson Grieve (6 June 1896 – 1 July 1982) was an Australian politician.

He was born in Watsons Bay to Gideon James Grieve and Julia Australia Robinson. He attended Sydney Grammar School before studying medicine at the University of Sydney, subsequently running a medical practice in Earlwood and Dulwich Hill. From 1932 to 1934 he was a United Australia Party member of the New South Wales Legislative Council. He was a member of the New South Wales Council of the British Medical Association from 1937 to 1956, serving as president from 1947 to 1948 and on the federal council from 1947 to 1956. Grieve was knighted in 1958. He died at Gosford in 1982.

References

1896 births
1982 deaths
United Australia Party members of the Parliament of New South Wales
Members of the New South Wales Legislative Council
Australian Knights Bachelor
20th-century Australian politicians